Uranotaenia is a subgenus of the mosquito genus Uranotaenia with 121 species:

Species
Species include:

References

Insect subgenera
Uranotaenia